Return to Oz is a 1985 dark fantasy film released by Walt Disney Pictures, co-written and directed by Walter Murch. It stars Nicol Williamson, Jean Marsh, Piper Laurie, and Fairuza Balk as Dorothy Gale in her first screen role. The film is an unofficial sequel to the 1939 Metro-Goldwyn-Mayer film The Wizard of Oz, and it is based on L. Frank Baum's early 20th century Oz novels, mainly The Marvelous Land of Oz (1904) and Ozma of Oz (1907). In the plot, an insomniac Dorothy returns to the Land of Oz to find it has been conquered by the wicked Nome King and his accomplice Princess Mombi ; she must restore Oz with her new friends Billina, Tik-Tok, Jack Pumpkinhead, the Gump, and Princess Ozma.

In 1954, Walt Disney Productions bought the film rights to Baum's remaining Oz books to use in the television series Disneyland; this led to the live-action film Rainbow Road to Oz, which was never completed. Murch suggested making another Oz film in 1980. Disney approved the project as they were due to lose the film rights to the series. Though MGM was not involved in the production, Disney had to pay a large fee to use the ruby slippers created for the 1939 film. Return to Oz fell behind schedule during production, and, following a change of Disney management, Murch was briefly fired.

Return to Oz was released in theaters on June 21, 1985. It performed poorly at the box office, grossing $11.1 million in the United States on a $28 million budget, and received mixed reviews, with critics praising the effects and performances but criticizing the dark content and twisted visuals with many deeming it inferior to the original film. However, it performed well outside the US, and has since acquired a cult following from fans of the Oz books for being more faithful to L. Frank Baum's works and those who saw the film at a young age. It received an Oscar nomination for Best Visual Effects.

Plot

In autumn of 1899, Dorothy Gale's obsession with the Land of Oz troubles her Aunt Em and Uncle Henry, who believe she is delusional. They take her to the sanitarium of Dr. Worley who, assisted by Nurse Wilson, plans to administer electrotherapy before lightning causes a power failure. Dorothy is freed by a mysterious girl who tells her that Worley's machines damage patients. Nurse Wilson chases the girls into a river, where Dorothy climbs aboard a floating chicken coop but is unable to save the other girl and floats away downstream.

Dorothy wakes up in Oz with her chicken Billina, who can now talk. They follow a damaged Yellow Brick Road to the Emerald City, now in ruins and its citizens turned to stone. They are attacked by the Wheelers, people with wheels instead of hands and feet, but are saved by Tik-Tok, a mechanical man who was told by Scarecrow, the king of Oz, to wait for Dorothy's return. Learning the Nome King is responsible for the devastation, Dorothy, Billina and Tik-Tok then travel to Princess Mombi's castle with the hope of finding out where Scarecrow is.

Mombi, who has a collection of different heads she "wears", reveals that Scarecrow is being held by the Nome King at his mountain. Intending to take Dorothy's head for her collection, Mombi imprisons the group in a tower with Jack Pumpkinhead, who explains he was brought to life by Mombi's Powder of Life. The four construct a flying creature out of furniture with the head of the Gump, a moose-like animal, and Dorothy steals the powder from Mombi to bring it to life. The Gump flies them across the Deadly Desert to the Nome King's mountain, Mombi has the Wheelers take her in pursuit of Dorothy.

The Gump crashes on the Nome King's mountain, where Dorothy is briefly reunited with Scarecrow before he is turned into an ornament by the Nome King. He gives each of the group three attempts to identify which ornament in his large collection is Scarecrow; the Gump, Jack and Tik-Tok all fail and are turned into ornaments themselves. Before Dorothy begins her turn, The Nome King reveals to her he has her lost ruby slippers, which he had used to conquer Oz, and offers to use them to send her home instead. Dorothy refuses and goes to find her companions while Mombi arrives at the mountain.

With her last guess, Dorothy turns a green gem into Scarecrow and realizes people from Oz turn into green objects. She proceeds to find and restore Jack and the Gump, enraging the Nome King who imprisons Mombi in a cage for allowing Dorothy's escape. He then grows to a gigantic size and prepares to eat Jack when Billina, hiding in Jack's head, lays an egg that falls into the Nome King's mouth, fatally poisoning him. Dorothy retrieves the ruby slippers and hurriedly puts them on as the ornament room and all of the subterranean Nome kingdom collapses. She wishes for the group to be returned to a restored Emerald City, where they find a green medal on Gump's antler that Dorothy restores into Tik-Tok.

The people of Oz ask Dorothy to be their Queen, but she expresses her desire to return home, while Billina chooses to stay in Oz. Princess Ozma - the girl from the sanitarium and rightful ruler of Oz - is freed from the mirror Mombi imprisoned her in and ascends the throne. Ozma receives the ruby slippers from Dorothy and uses them to send Dorothy home, promising she can return if she ever wishes it. Dorothy is found by her family on a riverbank in Kansas and Aunt Em tells her the clinic was struck by lightning and burned down; everyone survived except Worley, who died trying to save his machines. Dorothy returns home and sees Billina and Ozma through her bedroom mirror; she calls out for Aunt Em, but they signal for her to keep Oz a secret.

Cast

Live action

Voice cast

Puppeteers

Production

Development
Walter Murch began development of Return to Oz in 1980, during a brainstorming session with Walt Disney Productions production chief Tom Wilhite. Murch told Wilhite he was interested in making an Oz film and Wilhite "sort of straightened up in his chair". Unbeknownst to Murch, Disney owned the rights to the Oz series and wanted to make a new film as the copyright was soon to expire. In September 1981, Disney president Ron W. Miller announced that the studio would be making the film, not as a sequel or continuation of the 1939 movie, but instead an entirely new story with a different look to the original film.

Return to Oz is based on the second and third Oz books, The Marvelous Land of Oz (1904) and Ozma of Oz (1907). The element about Tik-Tok being "The Royal Army of Oz" derives from Tik-Tok of Oz (1914), in which he is made the Royal Army of Oogaboo and also makes frequent cries of "Pick me up!" That book was itself based on a dramatic production, The Tik-Tok Man of Oz (1913). Murch also used the book Wisconsin Death Trip as a historical source for the film. Murch co-wrote the screenplay with Gill Dennis, intentionally writing a film that was unlike the original to avoid accusations of blasphemy. Executive Producer Gary Kurtz noted, "We're not trying to make a sequel, although technically the books are sequels to each other", suggesting that the movie would be more faithful to the books than the 1939 film was.

Murch took a darker take on Baum's source material than the 1939 adaptation, which he knew would be a gamble. Between the development period and actual shooting, there was a change of leadership at the Walt Disney studios (with Wilhite replaced by Richard Berger), and the film's budget increased. Despite an original $20 million budget, this eventually rose to $28 million.

The film was developed and produced without the involvement of Metro-Goldwyn-Mayer, the studio behind the 1939 film. No approval was necessary because, by 1985, the Oz books on which it was based were in the public domain, and the subsequent Oz books had been optioned to Disney many years earlier. The ruby slippers were created by MGM specifically for the 1939 film to replace the Silver Shoes of the original stories and, as the slippers remained MGM's intellectual property, a fee was paid. Another carry-over from the 1939 film was the framework in which real characters from Kansas reappeared in Oz, which Murch kept in order to keep harmony between the two films.

Casting
Fairuza Balk was one of 600 from Vancouver chosen to audition for the role of Dorothy. Having spent four days in Los Angeles during November 1983, she learned she had secured the role the following month. Speaking of the audition process, Balk said "I just burst with tears because I was so happy. It was a really big thing for me even to get an audition for a real feature film." In casting the relatively unknown Balk, who was the second youngest auditionee from around 1,000 children auditioned across eight cities, Murch said he "wanted to find somebody who might be Judy Garland's cousin once removed." Maslansky believed Balk was born to play the role, saying "She is Dorothy as described by Baum. She is also Dorothy as I think Judy Garland would have loved to play her if she were that age."

Emma Ridley was cast in the role of Ozma, which she described as "a dream come true". In preparation for the role, she would watch visual adaptions of the story and analyzed the opinions of critics of Ozma. Ridley described how she tried to make her Kansas character "very calm, very studious", opting to wear little makeup and perform barefoot, while wanting a complete difference for Ozma, who was shown with a transformed appearance and attire. There was a gap of several months between Ridley filming the Kansas scenes to the Oz scenes. Ridley, who was born in London, had her voice in the film dubbed by Beatrice Murch, daughter of Walter Murch, so that the character of Ozma would have an American-sounding voice.

Leo McKern and Christopher Lloyd were each considered for the role of Dr. J.B. Worley/The Nome King before Nicol Williamson was cast.

For the role of Billina, around 40 real chickens were available during filming, each that were good for different things. Cages were tagged with the chicken's purpose, including perch, sit, carry and run to name a few, as well as chickens that would attack and others to run towards cast members. As Balk's small arms could not handle carrying a full-size chicken, a smaller one was used for those scenes. A mechanical chicken was also used for certain scenes, at times behaving so similar to a real chicken that crew in the screening room were unable to tell the difference. The dog playing the role of Toto was Tansy, a brown-eyed border terrier family pet. Director Walter Murch had already seen around 50 dogs before seeing Tansy.

Filming
Principal photography began on February 20, 1984, and wrapped in October 1984. Originally, filming was to be shot 75% on location, including Oz-like locations in Algeria and Italy; however, due to budget restraints from Disney, the movie was filmed entirely in the United Kingdom at Elstree Studios. Kansas scenes were filmed at Salisbury Plain, which was described as a "natural choice" by Maslansky due to it being flat and within close proximity to London. The temperature at Salisbury Plain during filming was described by Maslansky as "freezing", saying of Balk that "she would cry from the cold, from the pain of the cold – but she would never complain." The original cameraman, Freddie Francis, quit after shooting the Kansas scenes due to impatience with Murch.

Once shooting began, Murch began to fall behind schedule, and there was further pressure from the studio. Five weeks into production, Disney was unhappy with the footage. By then, mostly the Kansas scenes had been shot; however, Murch was looking unwell and was fired from the role without protestation. Murch later recalled the experience, saying "had I fought back... they might have said OK, but I couldn't fight back. I felt what the soul feels after it's left the body after a car accident — pain but tremendous relief." High-profile film-makers including George Lucas and Francis Ford Coppola supported Murch in discussions with the studio, and Murch was reinstated and finished the film. Lucas guaranteed that he would step in as replacement if any further problems emerged.

Balk and Ridley, the only two child actors on set, had limited working hours per day. Balk, who was in around 98% of all scenes, was permitted to work no more than three-and-a-half hours each day, restricted to between 9:30am to 4:30pm which included breaks and private educational tuition. Balk's privacy was carefully guarded and she was not available to meet with journalists. Whilst Balk did her own stunts, Ridley had a stand-in. Filming for the river scenes took place in a sound stage, described by Ridley as being "like a hot Jacuzzi".

Various scenes, in particular those with the Nome King, used clay animation to achieve the desired effect. When interviewed in 2020, director and animator Doug Aberle explained the process involved in animating the Nome King and other characters with clay, including the technical difficulties encountered. Each section, such as the outside rocks with faces on, was allocated to an animator. Nome King scenes in the throne room were animated progressively, with the character initially made entirely of clay, progressing gradually closer to human form until finally portrayed by Nicol Williamson in live action. Towards the end of the film when the Nome King crumbles, Aberle explains how it took him four attempts to animate this accurately.

The Emerald City scenes towards the end of film had to be fully reshot, as the character of Ozma was originally dressed in a gold lace dress which was deemed unsuitable during post-production.  The scenes were re-shot with the actress wearing a white and green dress, described by Ridley as being "very itchy and very uncomfortable", as she had grown by the time filming took place. At one point during filming these scenes, Balk collapsed due to the high on-set temperature.

Post-production
On describing the movie compared with the 1939 version, Balk said "it's a different story and a different picture, and I didn't try to copy anything Judy Garland did. It's not that much scarier, but it isn't as bright." She enjoyed working with the cast of 30 chickens, describing them as "really sweet" and praising their acting ability. Jean Marsh said she thought 'Return to Oz' would be easy to film, noting "I thought this picture would be a breeze, but it's difficult to hit it absolutely right." She trusted Murch's direction in making his dream a reality, describing him "like a mad, vague professor. He's totally original."

Release

Theatrical
Return to Oz had its world premiere in the United States on June 21, 1985, opening in 1,300 theaters including the Radio City Music Hall in New York City. Disney spent approximately $6 million on printing and advertising to promote the film, as well as adding a scene on a Return to Oz float, including characters from the film which appeared as part of Disneyland's Main Street Electrical Parade. The film was released in London theatres on July 11, 1985. This was the first film to use the Walt Disney Pictures logo from 1985 to 2006, which would later receive a fanfare, based on "When You Wish Upon a Star", composed by John Debney, with The Black Cauldron.

Home media
The film has been released to VHS, Betamax, Laserdisc, DVD, and Blu-ray over the years. The initial release, to VHS, Laserdisc, and Beta, occurred in December 1985 shortly after the theatrical release, with the VHS initially priced with a list price of $79.95. Disney reissued it in 1992 with alternate cover art. In 1999, Anchor Bay Entertainment, who had obtained the home video rights to several titles from Disney's live-action catalogue, issued the film on full-screen and letterbox VHS, as well as a DVD release featuring both versions. All three releases featured an intro by Fairuza Balk before the film and an interview featurette with her after it. All three versions went out of print shortly after their release.

In 2004, Disney released their own DVD, which dropped the Anchor Bay disc's fullscreen version and added anamorphic enhancement for 16:9 TVs for the widescreen version, upgraded the audio to 5.1 surround, retained the Anchor Bay disc's extras, and added four TV spots and a theatrical trailer. In 2015, Disney released a 30th Anniversary Edition of the film on Blu-ray exclusively through the Disney Movie Club, featuring a newly remastered and cleaned up transfer and DTS Master Audio 5.1 sound, but none of the bonus features from the 2004 DVD.

It is featured in the "From the Vault" Film section of Disney's streaming platform, Disney+.

Reception

Box office
It earned $2,844,895 in its opening weekend, finishing in seventh place and $6.5 million in the 10 days after release. After the opening weekend, Commonwealth Theaters reported that some venues took between just $300–$400, considered at the time to be poor. Jeff Love, city manager of the theater chain, believed it may have been due to a bad release time, suggesting that "they should have released it when people didn't have anything to do. It should have been before people got out and started going on vacation". Love went on to suggest that the perception of it being a children's film was another problem". It ultimately grossed $11,137,801 in North America.

Critical response
The film received mixed reviews. The film critics aggregator Rotten Tomatoes records 56% positive reviews based on 36 reviews, its critical consensus reads, "Return to Oz taps into the darker side of L. Frank Baum's book series with an intermittently dazzling adventure that never quite recaptures the magic of its classic predecessor." Those who were familiar with the Oz books praised its faithfulness to the source material of L. Frank Baum such as author and critic Harlan Ellison who said, “It ain’t Judy Garland. It ain’t hip-hop. But it’s in the tradition of the original Oz books.”

However, many critics described its tone and overall content as slightly too dark and intense for young children. "Children are sure to be startled by its bleakness," said The New York Times Janet Maslin. Ian Nathan of Empire Magazine gave the film three out of five stars, saying: "This is not so much a sequel but an homage and not a good one." Canadian film critic Jay Scott felt the protagonists were too creepy and weird for viewers to relate or sympathize with: "Dorothy's friends are as weird as her enemies, which is faithful to the original Oz books but turns out not to be a virtue on film, where the eerie has a tendency to remain eerie no matter how often we're told it's not." "It's bleak, creepy, and occasionally terrifying," added Dave Kehr of the Chicago Reader. Amelie Gillette of The A.V. Club frequently refers to its dark nature as unsuitable for its intended audience of young children although it had been one of her favorite movies growing up. Other reviews described the movie as "a horror show flying under the banner of family entertainment."

Neil Gaiman reviewed Return to Oz for Imagine magazine, and stated that "Terrifying and visionary, funny and exciting, Return to Oz is one of the very best fantasy films I've ever seen."

By the time of the film's release, the only surviving cast member from the 1939 film was Ray Bolger, who said in an interview that although he had no desire to watch the film, he noted that "they have a beautiful young lady as Dorothy and what I've seen of the film looks intriguing. It might be interesting for today's young people to see another version of the story.

Censorship
The film was banned for a very short period of time in Ingham County, Michigan, due to reports of protests over its "restricted" rules at the Ingham County Library near Lansing. At the time, the library decided not to bring its sale to the film because it couldn't comply with the school board that "G-rated films were only allowed to be shown only." The ban was lifted soon afterward.

Accolades
The film received an Academy Award nomination for Best Visual Effects, but lost to Cocoon. The nomination was given to Will Vinton, Ian Wingrove, Zoran Perisic and Michael Lloyd. Fairuza Balk and Emma Ridley were nominated for Young Artist Awards and multiple Youthies. It received two Saturn Award nominations for Best Fantasy Film (losing to Ladyhawke) and Best Younger Actor for Fairuza Balk (who lost to Barret Oliver for D.A.R.Y.L.).

See also

 Journey Back to Oz

ReferencesCitationsSources'

External links
 
 
 
 
 

1980s fantasy adventure films
1985 directorial debut films
1985 films
American dark fantasy films
American fantasy adventure films
American sequel films
Apocalyptic films
British fantasy adventure films
British sequel films
Film controversies in the United States
Film censorship in the United States
Censored films
Disney controversies
Films about witchcraft
Films about psychiatry
Films based on American novels
Films based on fantasy novels
Films based on multiple works of a series
Films based on The Wizard of Oz
Films based on works by L. Frank Baum
Films produced by Paul Maslansky
Films set in 1899
Films set in Kansas
Films set in psychiatric hospitals
Films shot at EMI-Elstree Studios
Films shot in Hertfordshire
Films scored by David Shire
Films using stop-motion animation
Films with live action and animation
Unofficial sequel films
Walt Disney Pictures films
Films with screenplays by Walter Murch
1980s English-language films
1980s American films
1980s British films
Poisoning in film
Films directed by Walter Murch